Ella Fitzgerald Sings the Duke Ellington Song Book is a 1957 studio album by the American jazz singer Ella Fitzgerald, accompanied by Duke Ellington and his orchestra, focusing on Ellington's songs.

Part of Fitzgerald's "Song Book" series, it is the only one where the composer is also featured as a performer and the first occasion Fitzgerald recorded with Ellington. It is also the entry in the Song Book series that provided her with the most opportunities to exhibit her skill at scat singing.

The greater part of disc three is devoted to two original compositions by Billy Strayhorn, inspired by Fitzgerald's life, character, and artistry. Fitzgerald's performance on this album won her the Grammy Award for Best Jazz Performance, Individual, at the 1st Annual Grammy Awards.

The album was released in two volumes: The first volume comprised Fitzgerald with the Ellington orchestra, the second of Fitzgerald with a small group setting.

This album marked the start of a fruitful artistic relationship for Fitzgerald and Ellington. The 1960s would see them perform on the Côte d'Azur for the album Ella and Duke at the Cote D'Azur (1966), and in Sweden for The Stockholm Concert, 1966. Their only other studio album is Ella at Duke's Place (1965).

Track listing
For the 1957 Verve 4-LP set: Verve MGV 4010-4

Disc one
"Rockin' in Rhythm" (Harry Carney, Duke Ellington, Irving Mills) – 5:17
"Drop Me Off in Harlem" (Nick Kenny) – 3:48
"Day Dream" (John La Touche, Billy Strayhorn) – 3:56
"Caravan" (Ellington, Mills, Juan Tizol) – 3:51
"Take the "A" Train" (Strayhorn) – 6:37
"I Ain't Got Nothin' But the Blues" (Ellington, Don George) – 4:39
"Clementine" (Strayhorn) – 2:37
"I Didn't Know About You" (Bob Russell) – 4:10
"I'm Beginning to See the Light" (Ellington, George, Johnny Hodges, Harry James) – 3:24
"Lost in Meditation" (Mills, Lou Singer, Tizol) – 3:24
"Perdido" (Ervin Drake, H.J. Lengsfelder, Tizol) – 6:10
"Cotton Tail" (Duke Ellington) – 3:23
"Do Nothin' Till You Hear from Me" (Russell) – 7:38
"Just A-Sittin' and A-Rockin'" (Lee Gaines, Strayhorn) – 3:30
"(In My) Solitude" (Eddie DeLange, Duke Ellington, Irving Mills) – 2:04
"Rocks in My Bed" – 3:56
"Satin Doll" (Johnny Mercer, Strayhorn) – 3:26
"Sophisticated Lady" (Mitchell Parish) – 5:18

Disc two
"Just Squeeze Me (But Please Don't Tease Me)" (Gaines) – 4:13
"It Don't Mean a Thing (If It Ain't Got That Swing)" (Ellington, Mills) – 4:12
"Azure" (Mills) – 2:18
"I Let a Song Go Out of My Heart" (Mills, Henry Nemo, John Redmond) – 4:08
"In a Sentimental Mood" (Manny Kurtz, Mills) – 2:44
"Don't Get Around Much Anymore" (Russell) – 4:59
"Prelude to a Kiss" (Irving Gordon, Mills) – 5:26
"Mood Indigo" (Barney Bigard, Mills) – 3:24
"In a Mellow Tone" (Milt Gabler) – 5:07
"Love You Madly" – 4:37
"Lush Life" (Strayhorn) – 3:37
"Squatty Roo" (Hodges) – 3:38
"I'm Just a Lucky So-and-So" (Mack David) – 4:12
"All Too Soon" (Carl Sigman) – 4:22
"Everything But You" (George, James) – 2:53
"I Got it Bad (And That Ain't Good)" (Paul Francis Webster) – 6:11
"Bli-Blip" (Sid Kuller) – 3:01

Disc three
"Chelsea Bridge" (Strayhorn) – 3:20
"Portrait of Ella Fitzgerald" (Strayhorn) – 16:10
 First Movement: "Royal Ancestry"
 Second Movement: "All Heart"
 Third Movement: "Beyond Category"
 Fourth Movement: "Total Jazz"
"The E and D Blues" (E for Ella, D for Duke) (Strayhorn) – 4:48

Bonus Tracks; Issued on the Verve 1999 3CD re-issue, Verve 314 559 248-2
"Chelsea Bridge – rehearsal" – 4:03
"Chelsea Bridge – rehearsal" – 3:37
"Chelsea Bridge – rehearsal" – 3:59
"Chelsea Bridge – rehearsal" – 3:20
"Chelsea Bridge – rehearsal" – 1:38
"Chelsea Bridge – rehearsal" – 1:20
"Chelsea Bridge – rehearsal" – 5:35
"Chelsea Bridge – rehearsal" – 3:39
"All Heart – rehearsal" – 3:54
"All Heart – alternative take I" – 3:33
"All Heart – alternative take II" – 3:22
"All Heart – alternative take III" – 3:25

Recorded June 15–October 27, 1957, Hollywood, Los Angeles, California.

Personnel
 Ella Fitzgerald – vocals
 William "Cat" Anderson, Clark Terry, Willie Cook – trumpet
 Dizzy Gillespie – trumpet on "Take the "A" Train"
 Frank Foster – tenor saxophone
 Paul Gonsalves, Ben Webster – saxophone
 Johnny Hodges – alto saxophone
 Russell Procope – clarinet, alto saxophone
 Jimmy Hamilton – clarinet, tenor saxophone
 Harry Carney – clarinet, bass clarinet
 John Sanders, Britt Woodman, Quentin Jackson – trombone
 Ray Nance – trumpet, violin
 Stuff Smith – violin
 Oscar Peterson, Paul Smith – piano
 Ray Brown, Joe Mondragon, Jimmy Woode – double bass
 Herb Ellis, Barney Kessel – guitar
 Sam Woodyard, Alvin Stoller – drums
 Billy Strayhorn – piano, narrator
 Duke Ellington – piano, narrator, arranger, conductor

References

1957 albums
Albums arranged by Duke Ellington
Albums conducted by Duke Ellington
Albums produced by Norman Granz
Duke Ellington albums
Ella Fitzgerald albums
Verve Records albums